Kyle Hyland (born March 1, 1991) is a former American soccer player.

Career

College
Hyland played at IUPUI in Indianapolis From 2009–2012. In his freshman year, Hyland was selected as the team's freshman captain. In his freshman season he appeared in all of the team's 19 games, 16 of which were starts. Hyland made 3 attempts at the net but was unsuccessful. In his sophomore year (2010) he appeared in 17 matches, all of which were starts. Hyland also scored one goal and one assist. In his junior year (2011) of college he started all 18 matches the team participated in that season. Hyland made one goal and lead the team with 4 assists. He played 1,611 minutes in his junior year which set a new team record for most minutes played in a single season. Hyland also lead the team in shot attempts. In his senior year (2012) of college he racked up eight goals including 2 games with multiple goals and made 3 game winning goals his senior year.

Columbus Crew
The Columbus Crew of MLS picked Hyland up in the MLS 2013 preseason and was placed with the crew reserves. He managed 11 appearances with the crew reserves, 9 of which were starts for the crew reserves. Hyland also received 1 red card in the 2013 season. Hyland was the first player in IUPUI history to graduate and immediately sign a Soccer Club contract without going through the MLS SuperDraft.

Indy Eleven
Hyland spent 2014–2015 with Indy Eleven of the North American Soccer League.

OKC Energy FC
Hyland moved to OKC Energy FC for the 2016 season.

Career statistics

References

1991 births
Living people
American soccer players
Association football defenders
Columbus Crew players
Indy Eleven players
IUPUI Jaguars men's soccer players
North American Soccer League players
OKC Energy FC players
People from Bay Village, Ohio
Soccer players from Ohio
Sportspeople from Cuyahoga County, Ohio
USL Championship players
Homegrown Players (MLS)